Antonio Giorgilli (born 1949) is an Italian mathematical physicist, known for his work on the perturbative theory of Hamiltonian systems with applications to studies of orbital stability for major and minor planets.

Education and career
At the University of Milan he graduated in March 1974 in physics with Laurea thesis on normal modes for nonlinear Hamiltonian systems and then held junior academic appointments in the physics department there. He taught physics at the University of Calabria for the two academic years 1977 to 1979 and then at the University of Milan for the academic year 1978–1979. At the Computing Center of the University of Milan he was appointed, in July 1979, Deputy Director and then, in January 1980, Technical Director, maintaining this office until March 1982. From 1983 to 1998 he served as a tenured associate professor at the University of Milan's mathematical physics group. In October 1998 he became an associate professor at the newly established University of Milan-Bicocca, where he was promoted to full professor in November 2000. In October 2005 he moved to the University of Milan's department of mathematics, where he currently is a full professor.

In 1998 Giorgilli was an Invited Speaker of the International Congress of Mathematicians in Berlin. He is a corresponding member of Istituto Lombardo Accademia di Scienze e Lettere. The minor planet 27855 Giorgilli, discovered in 1995, is named in his honor.

Selected publications

 (This paper has been cited over 2000 times.)

 
(See Nekhoroshev estimates.)

References

External links
 4 lectures from SDSM 2017; Satellite Dynamics and Space Missions: Theory and Applications of Celestial Mechanics, conference sponsored by the Italian Society of Celestial Mechanics, University of Rome Tor Vergata, Aug. 28–Sept 2 2017 at San Martino al Cimino

1949 births
Living people
20th-century Italian mathematicians
21st-century Italian mathematicians
20th-century Italian physicists
Mathematical physicists
University of Milan alumni
Academic staff of the University of Milan